List of archaeological sites and dismantled stave churches in northern Europe. The list is still not complete, and will be continually revised as traces of churches are found all the time.

Iceland
 Þórarinsstaðir archaeological excavation in Seyðisfjörður, east Iceland (post church which predates stave church).

Norway
 Atrå stave church
 Aurland Stave church (Parts of it on display at Bergen Museum.)
 Austad stave church
 Bagn stave church, Sør-Aurdal municipality, Norway (Portal on display at (?) in Copenhagen. There are still two stave churches left in the municipality; Reinli stave church and Hedal stave church)
 Bjølstad stave church
 Bødal stave church
 Dal stave church
 Dovre stave church
 Flå stave church
 Fåberg stave church
 Gårå stave church
 Gaupne stave church, parts of which are incorporated into Old Gaupne Church
 Gausdal stave church
 Gransherad stave church
 Grindaker stave church
 Hafslo stave church
 Hakastein Church, Skien, archaeological excavation of post church constructed between 1010 and 1040.
 Hemsedal stave church
 Hof stave church
 Hylestad Stave Church, Setesdal. (Demolished and the portal on display at University Museum of Antiquities in Oslo Universitetets Oldsaksamling, Historisk Museum, Oslo)
 Imshaug stave church
 Kvie stave church
 Liseherad stave church
 Mæl stave church
 Nesland stave church
 Nes stave church, Nes municipality, Norway (The church is painted by I. C. Dahl)
 Øyfjell stave church
 Rennebu stave church
 Rinde stave church
 Fystro stave church
 Øyar Stave church
 St. Thomas Church, Filefjell (Filefjell stave church) at Filefjell, Norway (Well known church in Norwegian folklore)
 Sannidal stave church Lardal stave church
 Sauland stave church
 Stedje stave church (Parts of it on display at Bergen Museum, painted by J.C. Dahl, on display at Bergen Kunstmuseum.)
 Tonjum stave church (Parts of it on display at Bergen Museum.)
 Tuddal stave church
 Tuft stave church
 Ulvik stave church (Parts of it on display at Bergen Museum.)
 Vågå stave church is sometimes referred to as a stave church, but is the result of extensive reconstruction with reuse of materials from the demolished stave church. Original stave church was constructed in 1150, and was converted to a cruciform church in 1626–28.
 Vangsnes stave church
 Veggeli stave church
 Vegusdal stave church
 Veum stave church
 Vinje stave church
 Ål stave church, Ål, Hallingdal, dismantled in 1880. (Wood roof in the quire with paintings from the 13th century are now at display at Universitetets Oldsaksamling, Historisk Museum in Oslo)
 Årdal stave church (Parts of it on display at Bergen Museum.)

Sweden
 Maria Minor church in Lund built around 1060
 Drotten church in Lund
 Clemens church in Lund
 Hemse stave church (Gotland)
 Kalhyttans stave church by Filipstad
 Vänga stave church near Borås, dendrochronologically dated to 1063–1065.

References

Stave churches
Stave churches dismantled
Archaeological sites in Europe
Archaeological sites in Norway
Archaeological sites in Sweden